A Gundel crêpe (original Gundel palacsinta) is a crêpe-like variety of pancake from Hungary.

Overview
The first Gundel crêpe was created and invented by Károly Gundel, who made the pancake with ground walnuts, raisins, and rum filling, served flambéed in a dark chocolate sauce made with egg yolks, heavy cream and cocoa. The original recipe is secret; only the Gundel restaurant knows it. The restaurant serves 25,000 portions to their guests annually.

Austria
The dessert is well known in the Austrian kitchen. They recommend this pancake sometimes as Chocolate-walnut palatschinke or Walnut-palatschinke in Austria. It is usually served with whipped cream and normally does not contain raisins. The Hotel Sacher presents it based on the original prescription, with caramelized walnut.

See also

 Palatschinke
 List of pancakes

References

Bibliography
 Gundel, Karoly (1992). Gundel's Hungarian cookbook. Budapest: Corvina. p. 127. . OCLC 32227400

External links
 Gundel website 

Hungarian desserts
Pancakes